Gillingham Football Club is an English professional association football club based in Gillingham, Kent, playing in EFL League One, the third level of the English football league system, as of the 2021–22 season. The club was formed in 1893 as New Brompton F.C., a name which was retained until 1912, and has played home matches at Priestfield Stadium throughout its history. The club joined The Football League (now called the English Football League) in 1920, was voted out of the league in favour of Ipswich Town at the end of the 1937–38 season, but returned to the league 12 years later after it was expanded from 88 to 92 clubs. Between 2000 and 2005, Gillingham played in the second tier of the English football league system for the only time in the club's history, achieving a highest league finish of eleventh place in 2002–03. The club's first team have competed in numerous nationally and regionally organised competitions, and all players who have played 50 or more such matches, either as a member of the starting eleven or as a substitute, are listed below.

Jock Robertson, the team's captain when Gillingham first entered the League in 1920, made a total of 388 appearances, a club record which stood for over ten years until overtaken by Charlie Marks, although Marks' total of 434 appearances includes those made while the club played outside the Football League.  Goalkeeper John Simpson was the first Gillingham player to make over 600 appearances.  Another goalkeeper, Ron Hillyard, set a new record of 655 appearances in the early 1990s, although Simpson still holds the record for appearances solely in the Football League.  The club's all-time top goalscorer, with 149 career goals, is Brian Yeo, who also shares the record for the most League goals scored in a season with Ernie Morgan.

Key
The list is ordered first by number of appearances, and then date of debut.
Appearances as a substitute are included. This feature of the game was introduced in the Football League at the start of the 1965–66 season.
Statistics are correct up to the end of the 2021–22 season.

Players

See also
List of Gillingham F.C. players (25–49 appearances)
List of Gillingham F.C. players (1–24 appearances)

References

Players
 
Gillingham F.C. players
Association football player non-biographical articles